On 12 July 2013, a train crash occurred in the commune of Brétigny-sur-Orge in the southern suburbs of Paris, France, when a passenger train carrying 385 people derailed and hit the station platform. Seven people were killed and there were 428 injuries.

The accident was cited as the most serious rail crash in France since the 1988 Gare de Lyon accident in which 56 people were killed.

Accident

At 17:11 CEST (15:11 UTC) on 12 July 2013, SNCF Corail Intercités train 3657 from Paris Gare d'Austerlitz to Limoges derailed and crashed at Brétigny station, resulting in the deaths of seven people (three passengers on the train and four on the platform) and injuries to "dozens" more. 385 passengers were on board, and the crash occurred a few minutes after the train departed Austerlitz at 16:53. It was scheduled to arrive at Limoges-Bénédictins at 20:05. The trains and platforms at Brétigny were particularly busy as it was rush hour and the Friday before the Bastille Day holiday weekend.

The last four carriages derailed on a double slip, and the train then broke in two between its fourth and fifth carriages.<ref
    name="BigStory" /> The rear of the train deviated to the left from Track 1 to Track 3 at the following railroad switch.  With the fifth and seventh carriages following different tracks, the sixth carriage swept the platform between them for a distance of around 100metres.  It was pierced by a roof beam. The fifth carriage first hit the platform on its left and then came to rest along the opposite platform.

Response

Railway workers immediately took action, preventing, by a few seconds, a collision between the derailed carriages and another approaching from the opposite direction.

According to a police report, some thefts from passengers and throwing of projectiles at rescue workers occurred shortly after the accident. The Minister of Transport Frédéric Cuvillier and Interior Minister Manuel Valls described the incidents as "isolated acts" and said the throwing of missiles ceased when the police arrived.

Investigation

The SNCF, French Land Transport Accident Investigation Bureau (BEA-TT), and judicial authorities started three separate investigations into the accident.

The SNCF released its initial findings on 13 July 2013, reporting that the derailment appeared to have been caused by a track failure. A steel fishplate connecting two rails came loose  from the station at a set of switches, and became stuck in them. The last axle of the third carriage is thought to be the first to have hit the fishplate.

In January 2019, an SNCF manager who had been supervising track inspections at Brétigny before the crash was charged with homicide.

Causes

Three investigations were initiated, by the Évry public prosecutor, the Land Transport Accident Investigation Bureau (BEA-TT) of the Ministry of Transport, and the SNCF. The train is believed to have derailed on the approach to Brétigny when passing over a switch  before the station. The French transport minister Frédéric Cuvillier stated that the accident was not due to human error and ruled out  any responsibility on the part of the driver.

At a press conference the day after the accident, an SNCF director stated that the failure of a fishplate (rail joint) was the cause of the accident, confirmed in the third SNCF press conference by supporting photographs. According to Guillaume Pepy, the SNCF president, the fishplate broke away from the rails and became lodged in the middle of the switch, causing the derailment.

Pepy said the SNCF considered itself responsible for the lives of its passengers and announced a campaign to check all similar equipment, nearly 5,000 units throughout the network, whose maintenance is within the SNCF's remit.

Gallery

See also
 Grayrigg derailment (2007)
 Potters Bar derailment (2002)

References

2013 in France
Essonne
Transport in Île-de-France
Railway accidents in 2013
Derailments in France
July 2013 events in France